Harry Leslie Pickering (born 29 December 1998) is an English professional footballer who plays as a defender for  Blackburn Rovers.

Career

Crewe Alexandra
A graduate of Crewe Alexandra's Academy, Pickering signed professional terms with Crewe in March 2016. He made his debut on 22 April 2017, coming on as a 63rd-minute substitute for Callum Ainley against Leyton Orient at Gresty Road. Pickering scored his first senior goal on 24 February 2018 with an equaliser from a direct free kick away at Lincoln City in a game Crewe eventually won 4–1.

In April 2018, Pickering signed a new three-year contract at Crewe, with the option of a further year. At Colchester United on 21 August 2018, Pickering sustained a hamstring injury ruling him out of action for over a month.

In September 2020, Pickering signed a new three-year contract with the club, and in December 2020 was named Crewe captain in the absence of Perry Ng (Ng moved to Cardiff City the following month). Crewe rejected an initial offer from Blackburn Rovers during the January 2021 transfer window, but later agreed his move to Blackburn on a four-and-a-half year deal (to summer 2025) for an undisclosed fee, with Pickering remaining at Crewe on loan (and remaining club captain) until the end of the 2020-21 season.

Blackburn Rovers
Pickering made his Rovers debut at Ewood Park in a 2–1 win over Swansea City on 7 August 2021. He scored his first goal for Blackburn just over a month later in a 2–2 league draw against Luton Town at Ewood Park on 11 September 2021. After a run of strong defensive performances, Pickering suffered a hamstring injury on 2 January 2022 in Blackburn's game against Huddersfield Town which ruled him out of first team action for several weeks.

Career statistics

References

External links

1998 births
Living people
English footballers
English Football League players
Sportspeople from Chester
Crewe Alexandra F.C. players
Blackburn Rovers F.C. players
Association football midfielders